Indian foreign aid is the aid given by the Indian government to other governments. India's major quantum of foreign aid is given to neighbouring countries. That apart, India also extended a direct line of credit worth $30.66 billion dollars to several foreign countries for developmental projects. The way of providing a much larger share of aid in the form of concessional loans is quite similar to that of China. India has set up 'Indian Agency for Partnership in Development' as a part of Ministry of External Affairs (India) to channelize aid to recipient nations.

An American social enterprise, Devex reported in 2013 that India has spent USD 1 billion on foreign aid in 2012-13. Since 2009, the foreign aid had increased around 3.2 times annually. In 2017, the government declared that India had been a net donor in 2015-16. In the Indian Government budget of year 2019-2020 USD 1.32 billion (INR 8415 crore) were allocated (0.3% of the overall budget) for India's foreign aid programme. Indian aid receiving countries are Bhutan, Nepal, Afghanistan, Mauritius, Seychelles, Maldives, African nations, Caribbean nations and a few others. Over the years India has funded several infrastructure, development and  other projects in many  countries worth billions of USD.

Statistics

History
India's foreign aid program began in the 1950s through the Colombo Plan. Although India's contributions through the Colombo Plan were small, it was still the 5th highest contributor to the Plan and the highest contributor among developing countries. Nepal was the largest recipient of Indian aid. Nepal and Bhutan were the first countries to receive aid from India. In 1958, India committed to providing $100 million multi-year grants to Nepal and also extended a  loan to Myanmar.

Vaccine Maitri

Africa 

In May 2011, India pledged $5 billion to African countries, following an injection of $5.4bn in 2008 for infrastructure development. In 2015, Prime Minister Narendra Modi announced $600m (£393m) in assistance for development projects in Africa at an India-Africa Forum Summit attended by 50 African nation in October 2015 in New Delhi. PM Modi announce a concessional credit of $10 billion to Africa that included Nigeria and 50000 scholarships to African students at the India-Africa Forum Summit in 2015. India’s line of credit to Africa is close to $ 9 billion, with  projects taking up $ 7.4 billion. India sent a grant of $ 10 million to UN to fight Ebola and another $ 2 million bilaterally to Guinea to tackle the disease.

India was the first Asian country to become a member of the Africa Capacity Building Foundation (ACBF). Between 2002 and 2021, India provided over US$11 billion in concessions to African countries. India donated 150 metric tons of medical aid to 25 African countries, and supplied over 24.7 million doses of COVID vaccines to 42 countries in Africa as of February 2021.

In May 2017, India and Japan proposed a plan to build an Asia-Africa Growth Corridor (AAGC) to boost in economic development in region.

Asia

South Asia and neighbouring countries

Nepal 
India has aided many hydro-electric power plants in Nepal like Pardi, Trishuli and Devighat. , under foreign direct investment, India plans to fund two hydel projects of Upper Karnali and Arun III.India’s aid to Nepal was $ 142 million this year.

Bhutan 
India donated a total of $4.7 billion between 2000 and 2017 to Bhutan. Continuing the tradition, the Indian Government provided  financial aid of $ 47  million to Bhutan in the Union budget of 2019-20.

Maldives 
In 2019–20 $77 million  Indian aid went to the Maldives. Same year 2019 the Indian Government allocated an amount of $60 million  to African countries as financial aid.

Myanmar 
The Indian Government assigned a budget of $ 54 million for Myanmar. India has extended a $5 million aid to Myanmar as its assistance for development projects on the India-Myanmar border.

Bangladesh 
In January 2010, India announced a $1bn line of credit for Bangladesh, as a reward for its co-operation in dealing with terrorism and insurgency.In October 2017 India gave $4.5 billion line of credit—its third and largest ever—to Bangladesh during the two-day visit to Dhaka by finance minister Arun Jaitley.

Sri Lanka 
Also in November 2019 PM Modi offers $450 million development, anti-terror aid to Sri Lanka. In all, over $ 15 billion has been given to other Asian countries, mostly focusing on India's immediate neighbours for infrastructural development.

Afghanistan 
Also India assigned an amount of $ 54 million as financial aid to the neighbouring Afghanistan and PM Modi announced a $14 million grant for community development projects in the Caribbean Community and Common Market (CARICOM) and another $150 million Line of Credit for solar, renewable energy and climate change-related projects. India is the biggest regional donor to Afghanistan and fifth largest worldwide donor with over $3 billion in assistance.

India provided over $3 billion of aid to the former Islamic Republic of Afghanistan and was involved in over 400 projects across 34 provinces. These included several major infrastructure projects such as the Salma Dam, the Zaranj-Dalaram Highway, the Afghan Parliament building, restoration of the Stor Palace. India also helped build infrastructure such as roads, dams, electricity transmission lines and substations, solar panels, schools, and hospitals.

The Afghan-India Friendship Dam (also called Salma Dam) started construction in 1976 but was halted due to political instability. The project resumed work in 2014 and the dam was inaugurated in 2016. India's funds for the dam were nearly USD 290-300 million. In May 2011, India pledged $500m to Afghanistan in addition to its existing commitment of $1.5bn, acquiring considerable goodwill in that country.

Rest of Asia 
In 2015 India donated £ 5 million  to Jordan to help with the Syrian refugee crisis in that country. 

Same year 2015, India provided a total of $10 million as financial aid to Palestine; $4 million was given as project assistance towards the reconstruction of Gaza (on 12 January 2015), and $ 5 million was provided as budgetary aid.

Pacific 
In 2016 India extended 1 million dollars as immediate assistance to cyclone hit Fiji. In addition, a C-17 Globemaster aircraft with 45 tonnes of relief material, which had food products such as noodles, biscuits, milk powder, rice pulses, flour and salt, as well as 5.43 tonnes of medicines and 300 tents and kitchen sets was sent from India to Fiji.

Americas and Caribbean 
India, in September 2019 announced $ 14 million grant for community development projects in the Caribbean Islands and expressed support to specialized capacity building courses for professionals in these Caribbean nations. In 2019 India offered  aid to hurricane-devastated Caribbean nations through the Indian Mission at the UN and with partners in Antigua and Barbuda as well as Dominica and others an amount of $2 million from the India-UN Partnership Fund for South-South Cooperation for rehabilitation in Caricom. Caricom is an organisation of 15 Caribbean nations and their dependencies.

Other assistance 
Apart from financial aids, India has also provided helps in terms of manpower and other supplies to needy disaster struck countries. In 1971 Indian defence forces went to war with Pakistan which resulted in the liberation and creation of Bangladesh due to India's action.
Post Hurricane Katrina in 2005, Indian Air Force aircraft provided 25 tonnes of relief supplies at the Little Rock Air Force Base in Arkansas. It extended similar support post the 2008 Sichuan earthquake in China. India is funding development  projects in neighbouring countries like Bangladesh, Sri Lanka, Maldives, Afghanistan etc. Indian Food aid went to Sudan, South Sudan, Djibouti and Eritrea.  India also donates Medical aid to Belize and Liberia. Indian drugs like a consignment of the anti-malaria drug hydroxychloroquine went to Mauritius, Seychelles, Madagascar, Zambia, Uganda, Burkina Faso, Niger, Mali, Congo, Egypt and Comoros. Consignments of paracetamol went to Zambia, Uganda, Burkina Faso, Niger, Mali, Congo, Egypt, Equatorial Guinea, Chad, Republic of Congo, Senegal, Sierra Leone and Zimbabwe. India donated seven tons of essential medicines in 586 cartons to Nigeria in year 2020. In Nigerian India helped set up military institutions that are the Nigerian Defence Academy (NDA) at Kaduna, the Naval College at Port Harcourt and several other elite military training firms. Several Nigerian officers have trained over the years in Indian military academies. These are former Nigerian Presidents Olusegun Obasanjo, Ibrahim Babangida and many other top military officers. The present Nigerian  President Muhammudu Buhari also attended the prestigious Defence Services Staff Course (DSSC) at Wellington in 1970s. In Afghanistan India helped in removing the Taliban and has become the largest regional provider of humanitarian and reconstruction aid to the Islamic Republic of Afghanistan. India has built over 200 public and private schools, sponsors over 1,000 scholarships, hosts over 16,000 Afghan students." A US$ 318 million Indian Line of Credit (LoC) Agreement was signed between EXIM bank of India and Government of Sri Lanka in June 2017, also a contract agreement for around US$ 82.64 million for the supply of 160 passenger coaches to Sri Lanka Railways was signed between RITES Limited and Government of Sri Lanka. At the start of Corona virus pandemic India was The first to dispatched humanitarian aid to neighbouring countries including Bangladesh, Nepal, Bhutan, Afghanistan, Maldives, Seychelles & Mauritius. India has promised to help African nations like Uganda, Nigeria, Tanzania, Ethiopia by providing Coronavirus vaccine once it is produced in India. The Indian Serum Institute in Pune is developing a vaccine against COVID-19 in partnership with Oxford’s AstraZeneca. In Ahmedabad’s Zydus Cadila Park is developing a vaccine and Bharat BioTech Hyderabad is also developing a vaccine named Covaxin. All these vaccines once manufactured shall be made available to African nations. India provides 67 scholarships each year to Iranian students under ITEC, ICCR, Colombo Plan and IOR-ARC schemes. On 5 September 2019, India pledged a USD 1 billion credit (concessional loans) to Russia  for the development of Russia's far east. At present over 25,000 African students avail Indian  scholarships. In April 2020 during Armenian and Azerbaijan conflict India sent medical aid to Armenia. In September 2020 Guyana in South America received US$ 1 million supplies to fight COVID-19 from India.

References 

Contributions to foreign aid by country
Foreign relations of India
Indian foreign aid